Marit Løvvig (born 19 March 1938, in Fana) was a Norwegian politician for the Conservative Party.

She was elected to the Norwegian Parliament from Rogaland in 1977, and was re-elected on two occasions.

On the local level he was a member of Haugesund municipal council from 1967 to 1979. From 1971 to 1975 she was a deputy member of Rogaland county council.

Outside politics she spent most of her career as a school teacher. She was active in the Norwegian Association of Local and Regional Authorities for a period. In 2009 she was elected to lead the Rossabø parish council in Haugesund.

References

1938 births
Living people
Members of the Storting
Rogaland politicians
Conservative Party (Norway) politicians
People from Haugesund
Women members of the Storting
20th-century Norwegian politicians
20th-century Norwegian women politicians